Nsibidi (also known as nsibiri, nchibiddi or nchibiddy) is a system of symbols or proto-writing developed by the Ekpe secret society of the old Calabar Kingdom that is now made up of Cross River State and Akwa Ibom State of Southern of Nigeria.
They are classified as pictograms, though there have been suggestions that some are logograms or syllabograms. 

Use of the symbol system was first described in 1904. Excavation of terracotta vessels, headrests, and anthropomorphic figurines from the Calabar region of southeast Nigeria, dated to roughly the 5th to 15th centuries, revealed "an iconography readily comparable" to nsibidi.

There are several hundred nsibidi symbols.  They were once taught in a school to children. 
Many of the signs deal with love affairs; those that deal with warfare and the sacred are kept secret. 
Nsibidi is used on wall designs, calabashes, metals (such as bronze), leaves, swords, and tattoos. It is primarily used by the Ekpe leopard society (also known as Ngbe or Egbo), a secret society that is found across Cross River State among the Ekoi, Efik, Igbo people, Bahumono  and other nearby peoples.

Before the colonial era of Nigerian history, nsibidi was divided into a sacred version and a public, more decorative version which could be used by women. Aspects of colonial rule such as Western education and Christian doctrine drastically reduced the number of nsibidi-literate people, leaving the secret society members as some of the last literate in the symbols. Nsibidi was and is still a means of transmitting Ekpe symbolism. Nsibidi was transported to Cuba and Haiti via the Atlantic slave trade, where it developed into the anaforuana and veve symbols.

History

Robert Farris Thompson glosses the Ekoid word nsibidi as translating to "cruel letters", 
from sibi "bloodthirsty". The context is the use of the symbols by secret societies in the Old Calabar slave traders who had established a "lavish system of human sacrifice".
In Calabar, nsibidi is mostly associated with men's leopard societies such as Ekpe. The leopard societies were a legislative, judicial, and executive power before colonisation, especially among the Efik who exerted much influence over the Cross River.

Origin
The origin of nsibidi is attributed to the Ejagham people in Northern Cross River. Nsibidi spread throughout the region and was adopted by other cultures and art such as the Igbo uri or uli graphic design. In 1909 J. K. Macgregor who collected Nsibidi symbols claimed that nsibidi was formed by the Uguakima, Ebe or Uyanga subgroups of the Igbo people, which legend says were taught the script by baboons. However, the Nsibidi of the Ejagham people predates these events and it is believed that Macgregor had been misled by his informants.

Status
Nsibidi has a wide vocabulary of signs usually imprinted on calabashes, brass ware, textiles, wood sculptures, masquerade costumes, buildings and on human skin. Nsibidi has been described as a "fluid system" of communication consisting of hundreds of abstract and pictographic signs. Nsibidi was described in the colonial era by P.A. Talbot as "a kind of primitive secret writing", Talbot explained that nsibidi was used for messages "cut or painted on split palm stems". J.K. Macgregor's view was that "The use of nsibidi is that of ordinary writing. I have in my possession a copy of the record of a court case from a town of Enion [Enyong] taken down in it, and every detail ... is most graphically described". Nsibidi crossed ethnic lines and was a uniting factor among ethnic groups in the Cross River region.

Uses
Nsibidi spread to other parts of Nigeria, especially the Igbos who are neighbors to the old Calabar people (the Efik, Ibibio and Annang).

Court cases - "Ikpe"

Nsibidi was used in judgement cases known as 'Ikpe' in some Cross River communities. Macgregor was able to retrieve and translate an nsibidi record from Enyong of an ikpe judgement.

The record is of an Ikpe or judgement case. (a) The court was held under a tree as is the custom, (b) the parties in the case, (c) the chief who judged it, (d) his staff (these are enclosed in a circle), (e) is a man whispering into the ear of another just outside the circle of those concerned, (f) denotes all the members of the party who won the case. Two of them (g) are embracing, (h) is a man who holds a cloth between his finger and thumbs as a sign of contempt. He does not care for the words spoken. The lines round and twisting mean that the case was a difficult one which the people of the town could not judge for themselves. So they sent to the surrounding towns to call the wise men from them and the case was tried by them (j) and decided; (k) denotes that the case was one of adultery or No. 20.

Ukara Ekpe

Nsibidi is used to design the 'ukara ekpe' woven material which is usually dyed blue (but also green and red) and is covered in nsibidi symbols and motifs. Ukara ekpe cloths are woven in Abakaliki, and then they are designed by male nsibidi artists in the Igbo-speaking towns of Abiriba, Arochukwu and Ohafia to be worn by members of the Ekpe society. Symbols including lovers, metal rods, trees, feathers, hands in friendship war and work, masks, moons, and stars are dyed onto ukara cloths. The cloth is dyed by post-menopausal women in secret, and young males in public. Ukara was a symbol of wealth and power only handled by titled men and post-menopausal women.

Ukara can be worn as a wrapper (a piece of clothing) on formal occasions, and larger version are hung in society meeting houses and on formal occasions. Ukara motifs are designed in white and are placed on grids set against an indigo background. Some of the designs include abstract symbols representing the Ekpe society such as repeating triangles representing the leopard's claws and therefore Ekpe's power. Ukara includes naturalistic designs representing objects such as gongs, feathers and manilla currency, a symbol of wealth. Powerful animals are included, specifically the leopard and crocodile.

In popular culture
Nsibidi plays a central role in the Nsibidi Script Series of fantasy novels (book 1: Akata Witch, book 2: Akata Warrior, and book 3: Akata Woman) written by Nnedi Okorafor. 

Nsibidi was the inspiration for the Wakandan writing system shown in the 2018 Marvel Cinematic Universe film Black Panther.

Examples of Nsibidi
Below are some examples of nsibidi recorded by J. K. Macgregor (1909) and Elphinstone Dayrell (1910 and 1911) for The Journal of the Royal Anthropological Institute of Great Britain and Ireland and Man. Both of them recorded symbols from a variety of locations around the Cross River, and especially the Ikom district in what is now Cross River State. Both of the writers used informants to retrieve nsibidi that were regarded as secret and visited several Cross River communities.

  "Nsibidi"
  "Welcome"
  "Two men talking"
  "Door"
  "Gun"
  "Crossbow"

  "Calabash"
  "Big drum"
  "Etak Ntaña Nsibidi — Nsibidi's bunch of plantains. When the head of the house wants plantains he sends this sign to the head boy on the farm."
  "Umbrella"
  "Toilet soap"

  "Matchet"
  "Woman"
  "Man"
  "Moon"
  "Tortoise"

Gallery

References

External links
 Nsibidi Script — Cornell University Library

Proto-writing
Igbo language
Cross River languages
Writing systems of Africa
Visual motifs